ReIgnition Recordings was an independent record label releasing largely, but not solely, punk and post-hardcore albums. It was founded in Ithaca, NY in 1999, and operated under the name Law of Inertia Records after the magazine founded by Ross Siegel. It was renamed in December 2004 to maintain the journalistic integrity of the magazine.

Artists
Alli with an I
Angels in the Architecture
Billy Music
Dead Girls Ruin Everything
Death by Stereo
Drowningman
Edaline
Ettison Clio
Grey AM
Marathon
Reel Big Fish
The '65 Film Show
The A.K.A.s
The Beautiful Mistake
The Reunion Show
The Rise
The Scaries
The Static Age
This Year's Model
Ultimate Fakebook
Zolof The Rock & Roll Destroyer

Distributed artists
Fire When Ready
Nakatomi Plaza
Scream! Hello
Trophy Scars
Your Black Star

See also
 List of record labels

References

External links
 Official site
 Punknews.org Label Information

American independent record labels
Hardcore record labels
Alternative rock record labels